Sculpture in the Indian subcontinent, partly because of the climate of the Indian subcontinent makes the long-term survival of organic materials difficult, essentially consists of sculpture of stone, metal or terracotta. It is clear there was a great deal of painting, and sculpture in wood and ivory, during these periods, but there are only a few survivals. The main Indian religions had all, after hesitant starts, developed the use of religious sculpture by around the start of the Common Era, and the use of stone was becoming increasingly widespread.

The first known sculpture in the Indian subcontinent is from the Indus Valley civilization, and a more widespread tradition of small terracotta figures, mostly either of women or animals, which predates it. After the collapse of the Indus Valley civilization there is little record of larger sculpture until the Buddhist era, apart from a hoard of copper figures of (somewhat controversially) c. 1500 BCE from Daimabad. Thus the great tradition of Indian monumental sculpture in stone appears to begin relatively late, with the reign of Asoka from 270 to 232 BCE, and the Pillars of Ashoka he erected around India, carrying his edicts and topped by famous sculptures of animals, mostly lions, of which six survive. Large amounts of figurative sculpture, mostly in relief, survive from Early Buddhist pilgrimage stupas, above all Sanchi; these probably developed out of a tradition using wood that also embraced Hinduism.

During the 2nd to 1st century BCE in far northern India, in the Greco-Buddhist art of Gandhara from what is now southern Afghanistan and northern Pakistan, sculptures became more explicit, representing episodes of the Buddha's life and teachings.

The pink sandstone Hindu, Jain and Buddhist sculptures of Mathura from the 1st to 3rd centuries CE reflected both native Indian traditions and the Western influences received through the Greco-Buddhist art of Gandhara, and effectively established the basis for subsequent Indian religious sculpture. The style was developed and diffused through most of India under the Gupta Empire (c. 320–550) which remains a "classical" period for Indian sculpture, covering the earlier Ellora Caves, though the Elephanta Caves are probably slightly later. Later large scale sculpture remains almost exclusively religious, and generally rather conservative, often reverting to simple frontal standing poses for deities, though the attendant spirits such as apsaras and yakshi often have sensuously curving poses. Carving is often highly detailed, with an intricate backing behind the main figure in high relief. The celebrated bronzes of the Chola dynasty (c. 850–1250) from south India, many designed to be carried in processions, include the iconic form of Shiva as Nataraja, with the massive granite carvings of Mahabalipuram dating from the previous Pallava dynasty.

Bronze age sculpture

The first known sculpture in the Indian subcontinent is from the Indus Valley civilization (3300–1700 BCE). These include the famous small bronze Dancing Girl. However such figures in bronze and stone are rare and greatly outnumbered by pottery figurines and stone seals, often of animals or deities very finely depicted and crafted.

Pre-Mauryan art 

Some very early depictions of deities seem to appear in the art of the Indus Valley civilisation (3300 BCE - 1700 BCE), but the following millennium, coinciding with the Vedic period, is devoid of such remains. It has been suggested that the early Vedic religion focused exclusively on the worship of purely "elementary forces of nature by means of elaborate sacrifices", which did not lend themselves easily to anthropomorphological representations.

Various artefacts may belong to the Copper Hoard culture (2nd millennium BCE), some of them suggesting anthropomorphological characteristics. Interpretations vary as to the exact signification of these artifacts, or even the culture and the periodization to which they belonged. Some examples of artistic expression also appear in abstract pottery designs during the Black and red ware culture (1450-1200 BCE) or the Painted Grey Ware culture (1200-600 BCE), with finds in a wide area.

Most of the early finds following this period correspond to what is called the "second period of urbanization" in the middle of the 1st millennium BCE, after a gap about a thousand years following the collapse of the Indus Valley civilization. The anthropomorphic depiction of various deities apparently started in the middle of the 1st millennium BCE, possibly as a consequence of the influx of foreign stimuli initiated with the Achaemenid conquest of the Indus Valley, and the rise of alternative local faiths challenging Vedism, such as Buddhism and Jainism and local popular cults. Some rudimentary terracotta artifacts may date to this period, just before the Mauryan era.

Art of the Mauryan period (322-185 BCE)

The surviving art of the Mauryan Empire which ruled, at least in theory, over most of the Indian subcontinent between 322 and 185 BCE is mostly sculpture.  There was an imperial court-sponsored art patronized by the emperors, especially Ashoka, and then a "popular" style produced by all others.

The most significant remains of monumental Mauryan art include the remains of the royal palace and the city of Pataliputra, a monolithic rail at Sarnath, the Bodhimandala or the altar resting on four pillars at Bodhgaya, the rock-cut chaitya-halls in the Barabar Caves near Gaya, the non-edict bearing and edict bearing pillars, the animal sculptures crowning the pillars with animal and botanical reliefs decorating the abaci of the capitals and the front half of the representation of an elephant carved out in the round from a live rock at Dhauli.

This period marked the appearance of Indian stone sculpture; much previous sculpture was probably in wood and has not survived.  The elaborately carved animal capitals surviving on from some Pillars of Ashoka are the best known works, and among the finest, above all the Lion Capital of Ashoka from Sarnath that is now the National Emblem of India. Coomaraswamy distinguishes between court art and a more popular art during the Mauryan period. Court art is represented by the pillars and their capitals, and surviving popular art by some stone pieces, and many smaller works in terracotta.

The highly polished surface of court sculpture is often called Mauryan polish. However this seems not to be entirely reliable as a diagnostic tool for a Mauryan date, as some works from considerably later periods also have it.  The Didarganj Yakshi, now most often thought to be from the 2nd century CE, is an example.

Art of the Shunga period (180-80 BCE)

Terracotta arts executed during pre-Mauryan and Mauryan periods are further refined during Shunga periods and Chandraketugarh emerge as an important center for the terracotta arts of Shunga period. Mathura which has its basis in the pre-Mauryan period also emerges as an important center for Jain, Hindu and Buddhist art.

Satavahana art 
The Satavahana dynasty ruled much of the Deccan and sometimes other areas, including Maharashtra, between about the 2nd-century BCE and 2nd century CE.  They were a Hindu dynasty, who made many generous donations to Buddhist monks; some queens may have been Buddhist. The most significant remains of their sculptural patronage are the Sanchi and Amaravati Stupas, along with a number of rock-cut complexes.

Sanchi stupas were constructed by Emperor Ashoka and later expanded by Shungas and Satavahanas. Major work on decorating the site with Torana gateway and railing was done by the Satavahana Empire.

Cave temples 
Between the 2nd century BCE and 2nd century CE under Satavahanas, several Buddhist caves propped up along the coastal areas of Maharashtra and these cave temples were decorated with Satavahana era sculptures and hence not only some of the earliest art depictions, but evidence of ancient Indian architecture.

Amaravathi art 

The Amaravati school of Buddhist art was one of the three major Buddhist sculpture centres along with Mathura and Gandhara and flourished under Satavahanas, many limestone sculptures and tablets which once were plastered Buddhist stupas provide a fascinating insight into major early Buddhist school of arts.

Early South India
Stone sculpture was much later to arrive in South India than the north, and the earliest period is only represented by the Gudimallam Lingam with a standing figure of Shiva, from the southern tip of Andhra Pradesh.  The "mysteriousness" of this "lies in the total absence so far of any object in an even remotely similar manner within many hundreds of miles, and indeed anywhere in South India".  It is some 5 ft in height and one foot thick; the penis is relatively naturalistic, with the glans shown clearly.  The stone is local, and the style described by Harle as "Satavahana-related".  It is dated to the 3rd century BCE, or 2nd/1st century BCE.

Though the hardness of local granites, the relatively limited penetration of Buddhism and Jainism in the deep south, and a presumed persistent preference for wood have all been proposed as factors in the late development of stone architecture and sculpture in the south, "the mystery remains". The form of the Gudimallam Lingam, for example, would be a natural one to evolve in wood, using a straight tree trunk very efficiently, but to say that it did so is pure speculation in our present state of knowledge.  Wooden sculpture, and architecture, has remained common in Kerala, where stone is hard to come by, but this means survivals are very largely limited to the last few centuries.

Kushana art 

Kushan art is highlighted by the appearance of extensive Buddhist arts in the form of Mathuras, Gandharan and Amaravathi schools of art.

Mathura art 

Mathura art flourished in the ancient city of Mathura and predominantly red sandstone has been used in making Buddhist and Jain sculptures.

Gandharan art

Greco-Buddhist art is the artistic manifestation of Greco-Buddhism, a cultural syncretism between the Classical Greek culture and Buddhism, which developed over a period of close to 1000 years in Central Asia, between the conquests of Alexander the Great in the 4th century BCE, and the Islamic conquests of the 7th century CE. Greco-Buddhist art is characterized by the strong idealistic realism of Hellenistic art and the first representations of the Buddha in human form, which have helped define the artistic (and particularly, sculptural) canon for Buddhist art throughout the Asian continent up to the present. Though dating is uncertain, it appears that strongly Hellenistic styles lingered in the East for several centuries after they had declined around the Mediterranean, as late as the 5th century CE. Some aspects of Greek art were adopted while others did not spread beyond the Greco-Buddhist area; in particular the standing figure, often with a relaxed pose and one leg flexed, and the flying cupids or victories, who became popular across Asia as apsaras. Greek foliage decoration was also influential, with Indian versions of the Corinthian capital appearing.

Although India had a long sculptural tradition and a mastery of rich iconography, the Buddha was never represented in human form before this time, but only through some of his symbols. This may be because Gandharan Buddhist sculpture in modern Afghanistan displays Greek and Persian artistic influence. Artistically, the Gandharan school of sculpture is said to have contributed wavy hair, drapery covering both shoulders, shoes and sandals, acanthus leaf decorations, etc.

The origins of Greco-Buddhist art are to be found in the Hellenistic Greco-Bactrian kingdom (250 BCE – 130 BCE), located in today's Afghanistan, from which Hellenistic culture radiated into the Indian subcontinent with the establishment of the small Indo-Greek kingdom (180 BCE-10 BCE). Under the Indo-Greeks and then the Kushans, the interaction of Greek and Buddhist culture flourished in the area of Gandhara, in today's northern Pakistan, before spreading further into India, influencing the art of Mathura, and then the Hindu art of the Gupta empire, which was to extend to the rest of South-East Asia. The influence of Greco-Buddhist art also spread northward towards Central Asia, strongly affecting the art of the Tarim Basin and the Dunhuang Caves, and ultimately the sculpted figure in China, Korea, and Japan.

Gupta art (319-510)

Gupta art is the style of art, surviving almost entirely as sculpture, developed under the Gupta Empire, which ruled most of northern India, with its peak between about 300 and 480 CE, surviving in much reduced form until c. 550. The Gupta period is generally regarded as a classic peak and golden age of North Indian art for all the major religious groups. Although painting was evidently widespread, the surviving works are almost all religious sculpture. The period saw the emergence of the iconic carved stone deity in Hindu art, while the production of the Buddha-figure and Jain tirthankara figures continued to expand, the latter often on a very large scale. The traditional main centre of sculpture was Mathura, which continued to flourish, with the art of Gandhara, the centre of Greco-Buddhist art just beyond the northern border of Gupta territory, continuing to exert influence. Other centres emerged during the period, especially at Sarnath. Both Mathura and Sarnath exported sculpture to other parts of northern India.

It is customary to include under "Gupta art" works from areas in north and central India that were not actually under Gupta control, in particular art produced under the Vakataka dynasty who ruled the Deccan c. 250–500.  Their region contained very important sites such as the Ajanta Caves and Elephanta Caves, both mostly created in this period, and the Ellora Caves which were probably begun then. Also, although the empire lost its western territories by about 500, the artistic style continued to be used across most of northern India until about 550, and arguably around 650. It was then followed by the "Post-Gupta" period, with (to a reducing extent over time) many similar characteristics; Harle ends this around 950.
Three main schools of Gupta sculpture are often recognised, based in Mathura, Varanasi/Sarnath and to a lesser extent Nalanda. The distinctively different stones used for sculptures exported from the main centres described below aids identification greatly.

Both Buddhist and Hindu sculpture concentrate on large, often near life-size, figures of the major deities, respectively Buddha, Vishnu and Shiva. The dynasty had a partiality to Vishnu, who now features more prominently, where the Kushan imperial family generally had preferred Shiva. Minor figures such as yakshi, which had been very prominent in preceding periods, are now smaller and less frequently represented, and the crowded scenes illustrating Jataka tales of the Buddha's previous lives are rare. When scenes include one of the major figures and other less important ones, there is a great difference in scale, with the major figures many times larger. This is also the case in representations of incidents from the Buddha's life, which earlier had showed all the figures on the same scale.

The lingam was the central murti in most temples. Some new figures appear, including personifications of the Ganges and Yamuna rivers, not yet worshipped, but placed on either side of entrances; these were "the two great rivers encompassing the Gupta heartland". The main bodhisattva appear prominently in sculpture for the first time, as in the paintings at Ajanta. Buddhist, Hindu and Jain sculpture all show the same style, and there is a "growing likeness of form" between figures from the different religions, which continued after the Gupta period.

The Indian stylistic tradition of representing the body as a series of "smooth, very simplified planes" is continued, though poses, especially in the many standing figures, are subtly tilted and varied, in contrast to the "columnar rigidity" of earlier figures. The detail of facial parts, hair, headgear, jewellery and the haloes behind figures are carved very precisely, giving a pleasing contrast with the emphasis on broad swelling masses in the body. Deities of all the religions are shown in a calm and majestic meditative style; "perhaps it is this all-pervading inwardness that accounts for the unequalled Gupta and post-Gupta ability to communicate higher spiritual states".

Early Medieval  (600-1192-1206) onwards

Pala and Sena empires 
The Pala Empire ruled a large area in north and east India between the 8th and 12th centuries CE, mostly later inherited by the Sena Empire. During this time, the style of sculpture changed from "Post-Gupta" to a distinctive style that was widely influential in other areas and later centuries. Deity figures became more rigid in posture, very often standing with straight legs close together, and figures were often heavily loaded with jewellery; they very often have multiple arms, a convention allowing them to hold many attributes and display mudras. The typical form for temple images is a slab with a main figure, rather over half life-size, in very high relief, surrounded by smaller attendant figures, who might have freer tribhanga poses. Critics have found the style tending towards over-elaboration. The quality of the carving is generally very high, with crisp, precise detail. In east India, facial features tend to become sharp.

Though the Pala monarchs are recorded as patronizing religious establishments in a general sense, their patronage of any specific work of art cannot be documented by the surviving evidence, which is mostly inscriptions. However, there are much larger numbers of images that are dated, as compared to other Indian regions and periods, helping greatly the reconstruction of stylistic development.

Much larger numbers of smaller bronze groups of similar composition have survived than from previous periods. Probably the numbers produced were increasing. These were mostly made for domestic shrines of the well-off, and from monasteries. Gradually, Hindu figures come to outnumber Buddhist ones, reflecting the terminal decline of Indian Buddhism, even in east India, its last stronghold.

Temples of Khajuraho 

The temples of Khajuraho, a complex of Hindu and Jain temples, were constructed from the 9th to the 11th centuries by the Chandela dynasty. They are considered one of the best examples of Indian art and architecture.

The temples have a rich display of intricately carved sculptures. While they are famous for their erotic sculptures, sexual themes cover less than a tenth of the temple sculpture. The sculptures depict various aspects the everyday life, mythical stories as well as symbolic display of various secular and spiritual values important in Hindu tradition.

Dynasties of South India 

After the Gudimallam lingam (see above), the earliest dynasty of southern India to leave stone sculpture on a large scale was the long-lasting Pallava dynasty which ruled much of south-east India between 275 and 897, although the major sculptural projects come from the later part of the period. A number of significant Hindu temples survive, with rich sculptural decoration.  Initially these tend to be rock-cut, as are most of the Group of Monuments at Mahabalipuram (7th and 8th centuries), perhaps the best-known examples of Pallava art and architecture  Many of these exploit natural outcrops of rock, which are carved away on all sides until a building is left. Others, like the Shore Temple, are constructed in the usual way, and others cut into a rock face like most other rock-cut architecture. The Descent of the Ganges at Mahabalipuram, is "the largest and most elaborate sculptural composition in India", a relief carved on a near-vertical rock face some 29 metres (86 feet) wide, featuring hundreds of figures, including a life-size elephant (late 7th century).

Other Pallava temples with sculpture surviving in good condition are the Kailasanathar Temple, Vaikunta Perumal Temple and others at Kanchipuram, and the cave temples at Mamandur. The Pallava style in stone reliefs is influenced by the hardness of the stone mostly used; the relief is less deep and detail such as jewellery minimized, compared to further north. The figures are more slender and "delicately built and project sweetness and unmannered delicacy and refinement"; much the same figure type is continued in Chola sculpture in both stone and bronze. In large narrative panels some of the subjects are distinctively Tamil, such as Korravai (Durga as goddess of victory), and Somaskanda, a seated family group of Shiva, his consort Parvati and Skanda (Murugan) as a child.

The "imperial" Chola dynasty begins about 850, controlling much of the south, with a slow decline from about 1150. Large numbers of temples were constructed, which mostly suffered far less from Muslim destruction than those further north. These were heavily decorated with stone relief sculpture, both large narrative panels and single figures, mostly in niches on the outside. The Pallava style was broadly continued.

Chola bronzes, the largest mostly about half life-size, are some of the most iconic and famous sculptures of India, using a similar elegant but powerful style to the stone pieces. They were created using the lost wax technique. The sculptures were of Shiva in various avatars with his consort Parvati, and Vishnu with his consort Lakshmi, among other deities. Even large bronzes had the advantage that they were light enough to be used in processions for festivals.

The most iconic among these is the bronze figure of Shiva as Nataraja, the lord of dance. In his upper right hand he holds the damaru, the drum of creation. In his upper left hand he holds the agni, the flame of destruction. His lower right hand is lifted in the gesture of the abhaya mudra. His right foot stands upon the demon Apasmara, the embodiment of ignorance.

The Vijayanagara Empire was the last major Hindu empire, constructing very large temples at Hampi, the capital, of which much remains in generally good condition, despite the Mughal army spending a year destroying the city after its fall. Temples are often highly decorated, in a style that further elaborates the late Chola style, and was influential for later South Indian temples. Rows of horses rearing out from columns became a favourite and spectacular device. By the end of the period hugely expanded multi-storey gopurams had become the most prominent feature of templeas, as they have remained in the major temples of the south. The large numbers of figures on these were now mostly made from brightly painted stucco.

Late Medieval period or Islamic rule (1206-1757) 
The period was dominated by Islamic rulers, who not only did not produce figurative sculpture themselves, but whose armies, especially in the initial conquests, destroyed vast amounts of existing religious sculpture, which considerably discouraged the production of new figures.

Nonetheless, religious sculpture continued, especially in the far south, where the larger temples continued to expand in a rather competitive fashion. The late medieval southern innovation of towering gopuram gateways continued, and these were covered with large sculptures, in recent centuries mainly in brightly painted stucco. Very large halls were constructed for the large numbers of visitors in temples, sometimes filled with spectacular sculpture, like the famous row of life-size rearing horses at the Ranganathaswamy Temple, Srirangam from the 17th century.

British Colonial period (1757-1858-1947) 

During this period, European styled statues were erected in city squares, as monuments to the British Empire's power. Statues of Queen Victoria, George V, and various Governor-Generals of India were erected. Such statues were removed from public places after independence, and placed within museums. However, some still stand at their original location, such as Statue of Queen Victoria, Bangalore.

Post-independence (1947 - present) 
Modern Indian sculptors include D.P Roy Choudhury, Ramkinkar Baij, Pilloo Pochkhanawala, Mrinalini Mukherjee, Adi Davierwala, Sankho Chaudhuri and Chintamoni Kar. The National Gallery of modern Art has a large collection of modern Indian sculpture. Contemporary Indian sculptors include Sudarshan Shetty, Ranjini Shettar, Anita Dube and Rajeshree Goody.

Gallery

See also 

 Sculptures of Bangladesh
 List of rock-cut temples in India
 List of the tallest statues in India

Notes

References

Blurton, T. Richard, Hindu Art, 1994, British Museum Press,  
 Boardman, John, ed., The Oxford History of Classical Art, 1993, OUP, 
Craven, Roy C., Indian Art: A Concise History, 1987, Thames & Hudson (Praeger in USA),  
 Harle, J. C., The Art and Architecture of the Indian Subcontinent, 2nd edn. 1994, Yale University Press. (Pelican History of Art), 
 
Michell, George, The Penguin Guide to the Monuments of India, Volume 1: Buddhist, Jain, Hindu, 1990, Penguin Books, 
Mookerji, Radhakumud (1997), The Gupta Empire, Motilal Banarsidass Publ., google books
 Paine, Robert Treat, in: Paine, R. T. & Soper A, The Art and Architecture of Japan, 3rd ed 1981, Yale University Press. (Pelican History of Art), 
Rowland, Benjamin, The Art and Architecture of India: Buddhist, Hindu, Jain, 1967 (3rd edn.), Pelican History of Art, Penguin,  
Sickman, Laurence, in: Sickman L & Soper A, The Art and Architecture of China, (Pelican History of Art), 3rd ed 1971, Penguin (now Yale History of Art), LOC 70-125675

Further reading

Asian sculpture
 
 
South Asia